Jacques Lefèvre (born 1 February 1928) was a French fencer. At the 1952 Summer Olympics, Lefèvre won a team bronze medal for fencing, as a member of the French Men's Sabre team.  He competed for France in the individual and team sabre events at each Summer Olympics from 1948 to 1964.

See also
 List of athletes with the most appearances at Olympic Games

References

External links
Olympic medals
 

1928 births
Possibly living people
French male sabre fencers
Olympic fencers of France
Fencers at the 1948 Summer Olympics
Fencers at the 1952 Summer Olympics
Fencers at the 1956 Summer Olympics
Fencers at the 1960 Summer Olympics
Fencers at the 1964 Summer Olympics
Olympic bronze medalists for France
Olympic medalists in fencing
Sportspeople from Marseille
Medalists at the 1952 Summer Olympics
Mediterranean Games gold medalists for France
Mediterranean Games medalists in fencing
Fencers at the 1951 Mediterranean Games
20th-century French people